Emma is a four-part BBC television drama serial adaptation of Jane Austen's 1815 novel Emma. The episodes were written by Sandy Welch, writer of previous BBC costume dramas Jane Eyre and North & South, and directed by Jim O'Hanlon. The serial stars Romola Garai as the titular heroine Emma Woodhouse, Jonny Lee Miller as her loyal lifelong friend Mr. Knightley, and Michael Gambon as Emma's father, Mr. Woodhouse. The serial originally ran weekly on Sunday nights on BBC One from 4 to 25 October 2009.

Plot 
For a detailed account of the plot, see main article: Emma (novel)

Austen's classic comic novel follows the story of the "handsome, clever and rich" Emma Woodhouse. Dominating the small provincial world of Highbury, Emma believes she is a skilled matchmaker and repeatedly attempts to pair up her friends and acquaintances. Nothing delights her more than meddling in the love lives of others. But when she takes protégée Harriet Smith under her wing, her interference has a detrimental effect.

Brought up sharply against the folly of her own immaturity, the consequent crisis and her bitter regrets are brought to a happy resolution in a comedy of self-deceit and self-discovery.

Cast and characters

Main 
 Romola Garai as Emma Woodhouse: In Austen's opening lines of the novel: "Emma Woodhouse, handsome, clever, and rich, with a comfortable home and happy disposition, seemed to unite some of the best blessings of existence; and had lived nearly twenty-one years in the world with very little to distress or vex her." Emma has no need to marry, being head of her own household, and having plenty of money, but she delights in matchmaking those around her — and credits herself with being very good at it – despite Mr. Knightley's scepticism.
 Jonny Lee Miller as Mr. George Knightley: Mr. Knightley is Emma's only social and intellectual equal in Highbury, living at Donwell Abbey, a rambling country estate a short walk from Hartfield. His brother is married to Emma's older sister. He has known Emma since she was born, and there's an easy familiarity between them. He is an individual, quick-witted, with a dry sense of humour — often used in sparring with Emma. But he also has a strong moral compass — and at times he strongly disagrees with Emma over her behaviour.
 Michael Gambon as Mr. Woodhouse: Mr. Woodhouse is described by Austen as a valetudinarian — old before his time. He lost his wife when his two daughters were very young, and he has developed an extremely nervous disposition. He is a loving and kind father, but he worries constantly, especially about health. He hardly ever leaves Hartfield, and he hates the thought of Emma ever leaving him. He even sees the marriages of Isabella, Emma’s older sister, to Mr. John Knightley, and Miss Taylor, Emma’s beloved governess, to Mr. Weston, as disruptions to the life he leads with them.
 Louise Dylan as Harriet Smith: Harriet is a parlour boarder at Mrs. Goddard's School. She has been sent there to be educated, by her father, who remains anonymous, because Harriet is his "natural daughter" — i.e., she's illegitimate. Being a parlour boarder means that she has stayed on at the school to help with the other girls. She's pretty but not very bright, and she has little prospect of marrying a gentleman. Emma, however, is sure that Harriet's anonymous father must be a gentleman and takes her under her wing.
 Jodhi May as Anne Taylor/Weston: Anne has been Emma's governess since her mother died when Emma was a baby. More like a sister than a governess, Anne is wise and caring, but devoted to Emma and perhaps a little indulgent. When she marries Mr. Weston, she is worried about leaving Emma on her own at Hartfield.
 Robert Bathurst as Mr. Weston: Mr. Weston is an eternal optimist, despite the fact that his life has not always run smoothly. He married young, to a woman who spent all his money, who was disowned by her family, and then died, leaving him with Frank, his two-year-old son. He agreed for Frank to be adopted by his wife's estranged sister, who insisted that he change his name to Frank Churchill. Frank has lived in the lap of luxury ever since.
 Rupert Evans as Frank Churchill: Frank is a ball of energy, charming, mischievous, and spoilt. He has been kept at his manipulative aunt's beck and call for most of his life, and often seems to be called back to her bedside whenever he ventures away — although it is never entirely clear whether this is just a convenient excuse for not visiting Highbury and his father. At his worst, he could be a rogue — and he seems to delight in gossiping about Jane Fairfax.
 Laura Pyper as Jane Fairfax: Jane's parents died when she was a toddler. Her aunt, Miss Bates, and grandmother, Mrs. Bates, sent her from Highbury to live with the Campbells, who could offer greater advantages. Colonel Campbell knew she would be a good companion for his only daughter, Miss Campbell. Ever since, Jane has excelled at everything a girl should, and Miss Bates has bored and irritated Emma with Jane's virtues at every opportunity. Now Jane has reached the age where she must leave the Campbells and return to Highbury, and finding means to make a living, most likely as a governess — however, what is the real reason for her return?
 Tamsin Greig as Miss Bates: Miss Bates is the daughter of the former vicar of Highbury, who died many years ago. She has never married, and now never will. Without a husband to provide an income, she faces ever-increasing poverty. Despite her woes, Miss Bates has a perennially cheerful disposition. She fills any silence with incessant talk.
 Valerie Lilley as Mrs. Bates: Where Miss Bates talks non stop, her aged mother, Mrs. Bates, never speaks. She sits quietly in the corner of the room, or is wheeled from place to place by Miss Bates, revealing very little of what she really thinks of their situation.
 Blake Ritson as Mr. Elton: Mr. Elton is the vicar of Highbury. In the early 19th century, the post of vicar could be given, inherited, or bought, and conferred a certain social status as well as an annual income. Mr. Elton is a dashing young man, aware of his status in the village and his eligibility. He's charming — perhaps, at times, a little too charming, aiming at an advantageous marriage.
 Christina Cole as Augusta Elton: Mrs. Elton is rich, and a good catch for Mr. Elton in many ways. However she's also vulgar and interfering, and one-upmanship is second nature to her. She arrives in Highbury keen to prove her social standing, and immediately puts Emma's nose out of joint.

Recurring 
 Dan Fredenburgh as John Knightley
 Poppy Miller as Isabella Knightley
 Jefferson Hall as Robert Martin
 Veronica Roberts as Mrs. Goddard
 Liza Sadovy as Mrs. Cole
 Eileen O'Higgins as Miss Martin 1
 Sarah Ovens as Miss Martin 2
 Susie Trayling as Mrs. Churchill
 Frank Doody as Mr. Dixon
 Amy Loughton as Miss Campbell / Mrs. Dixon

Production 
Principal photography commenced with a four-day shoot in the Kent village of Chilham from 14 to 18 April 2009. Production design staff covered several roads with gravel to disguise the 21st-century road markings, and erected a fountain in the village square. Filming occurred from 8 a.m. to 7 p.m. every day and was scheduled to coincide with the Easter school holiday to minimise local disruption.

Filming continued at the parish church of St. Mary the Virgin in Send, Surrey on 24 and 28 April, where scenes of a wedding and a Sunday service were completed. Further filming took place at Squerryes Court, Westerham, Kent where many interior scenes were shot.

The scene that shows Emma and Harriet Smith on their way to visit the poor was filmed in Hatfield, Hertfordshire, England. The church they pass along the wooded path is St Etheldreda's Church, Hatfield.

Episodes

Critical reception 
Reviewing the first episode, Sam Wollaston of The Guardian called it "very good... even if it's not necessary", wishing the BBC would adapt some lesser-known novels rather than churning out the same adaptations again and again. He nevertheless praised the acting, suggesting Garai's "eyes alone deserve a BAFTA" and that Michael Gambon made "a splendid old Mr. Woodhouse".

John Preston of The Telegraph also noted Romola Garai as "particularly good" in the titular role, and noted that while Jim O Hanlon's direction was perhaps a little too "steady and sure" there was still "plenty of sprightliness there too". After the third episode of the series, however, he wrote that "[it] was a disaster, becoming ever more coarse and clumsy as it went on. The narration was obtrusive, the charm next to non-existent and the secondary characters insufficiently delineated." Emma he deemed "too bovine, too cocksure" in order for her to be truly in doubt. He did not find that Jonny Lee Miller, "who could have been a first-class Mr Knightley, was given enough screen time to make an impact". He concluded: "Contrivance ha[d] taken over. Sprightliness ha[d] disappeared. The soufflé ha[d] fallen."

Tom Sutcliffe of The Independent wrote in a review that "the primary-colour brightness seems to have carried over into some the performances." He found that Garai "[did]n't capture the sense of frustrated intelligence that makes Emma bearable on the page", but blamed the script for it. He also saw a casting problem with Emma and Knightley in the sense that Miller "still carrie[d] too much of the seductive bad boy about him" so that he was not convincing as a "surprising love object", and "that threatens one of the novel's great achievements, which is to educate us alongside its heroine."

Some critics also noted the dip in ratings following the first episode. In The Independent, Jonathon Brown observed that while "the critics have given it a qualified nod of approval" the second instalment of the serial "pulled in only 3.5 million viewers – down nearly 1 million on the opening episode the previous week – while the third episode saw another 200,000 switch off". He suggests this may be due to the "13 million-strong audience from ITV1's all-conquering X Factor" which had launched a Sunday night results show for the first time, or that "the days of bonnet and bustle are [simply] over".

Accolades

Soundtrack 
The original soundtrack with music composed by Samuel Sim was released on 8 December 2009 and features numerous themes featured in the series, including music from the dance sequences during the ball at the Crown Inn. A track listing for the album is as follows:

 "Emma Main Titles"
 "Emma Woodhouse Was Borne"
 "Expansion Project"
 "Rescued from the Gypsies"
 "A Ball"
 "Knightley's Walk"
 "Dolls"
 "The World Has Left Us Behind"
 "Arrival of Little Knightley"
 "Donwell Dancing Again"
 "Superior Men"
 "Matchmaker"
 "Walk of Shame"
 "Playing Harriet"
 "Without Suspicion"
 "Frank Is Free"
 "Mr. Elton"
 "Blind Endeavours"
 "The Last Dance"
 "Lost and Found"
 "Only People We Like"
 "The Ship's Cook"
 "Cliff Tops"
 "Secrets"
 "It's Snowing and Heavily"
 "The Seaside"
 "Love Story"
 "Most Ardently In Love"

References

External links 
 
 Emma – Behind the Scenes – BBC One. Video on BBC's YouTube channel
 
 Emma at PBS Online
 Filming of Jane Austen's Emma For BBC1 — photograph set on Flickr
 Romola Garai as Emma Woodhouse photos
 Emma CD soundtrack information

2009 British television series debuts
2009 British television series endings
2000s British drama television series
BBC high definition shows
BBC television dramas
2000s British television miniseries
Costume drama television series
Television series set in the 19th century
English-language television shows
Television series based on Emma (novel)
Television shows set in England
2000s British romance television series